Bleached is an American pop band consisting of sisters Jennifer and Jessica Clavin, formerly of Mika Miko. The band plays a style of rock, pop, rock and roll, and indie rock. Bleached was established in Los Angeles in 2011. The group has released three studio albums, Ride Your Heart (2013), Welcome the Worms (2016) and Don't You Think You've Had Enough?, all with Dead Oceans, and have charted on the Billboard charts.

History 

They formed in Echo Park, Los Angeles, California during 2011, with Mika Miko front woman Jennifer Clavin and guitarist Jessica Clavin. Micayla Grace joined in 2014 as a live member and drummer Nick Pillot in 2016.

The band released three singles, Francis, Carter, and "Searching Through the Past" / "Electric Chair", soon after their formation. Their subsequent release, a studio album, Ride Your Heart, was released on April 2, 2013, by Dead Oceans. This album charted on the Billboard magazine Heatseekers Albums chart, where it peaked at No. 18. They released, an extended play, For the Feel, in 2014, from Dead Oceans. The group released another studio album, Welcome the Worms, on April 1, 2016, with Dead Oceans. The album peaked on the Heatseekers Albums chart at No. 15, while it placed on the Independent Albums chart at No. 46.

Members 

Jennifer Clavin – lead vocals, guitar, synth
Jessica Clavin – lead guitar, bass
Nick Pillot – drums, percussion

Discography

Studio albums

EPs
 For the Feel (2014, Dead Oceans)
 Can You Deal? (2017, Dead Oceans)

Singles
 Carter (2011, Art Fag Recordings)*
 Francis (2011, Post Present Medium)*
 "Searching Through the Past" / "Electric Chair" (2011, Suicide Squeeze)

Notes
 * Non-album single (single's title is not the title of a featured song)

References

External links 

 

All-female punk bands
Musical groups from Los Angeles
2011 establishments in California
Punk rock groups from California
Musical groups established in 2011
Dead Oceans artists
Indie rock musical groups from California
Indie pop groups from Los Angeles
Suicide Squeeze Records artists
Pop punk groups from California
Garage rock groups from California
Post-punk revival music groups
Sibling musical groups
Rock music groups from California